The Communist Party of Canada (Marxist–Leninist) was the provincial branch of the Communist Party of Canada (Marxist–Leninist) (CPC-ML) in Manitoba. Its orientation was anti-revisionist (i.e. Stalinist).

The Communist Party of Canada (Marxist-Leninist) (CPC-ML) participated in Manitoba's 1973 provincial election, running candidates in three ridings. Glen Brown received 33 votes for the party in the riding of Burrows, Aili Waldman received 12 votes in Inkster and Diane Waldman received 24 votes in St. Johns. All of these ridings were in north-end Winnipeg, and all were also contested by the Communist Party of Canada - Manitoba (CPC-M), a branch of the Communist Party of Canada and a non-Stalinist rival to the CPC-ML.

The party also participated in a 1979 by-election in the north Winnipeg riding of Rossmere, following the resignation of Edward Schreyer.

The party encouraged voters to boycott Manitoba's 1981 election, claiming that none of the other parties (including the CPC-M) were worth supporting. It did not run any of its own candidates, and does not appear to have participated in any subsequent Manitoba elections.

During the 1990s the CPC-ML appears to have left the federal party. For several years CPC-ML(M) continued to operate a "Manitoba Regional Committee", publishing a weekly newsletter entitled Modern Communism. In December 2003, Kalturnyk published a work in Modern Communism entitled "The Famine that Never Was", arguing that a famine did not occur in Ukraine in 1933 and 1934. Its most prominent member is Ken Kalturnyk, who was the editor for Modern Communism in recent years. The website for "Modern Communism" is now down.

Communist Party of Canada (Marxist–Leninist)
Anti-revisionist organizations
Provincial political parties in Manitoba